The following events occurred in December 1993. For a more complete listing of notable deaths this month, see Deaths in December 1993.

December 1, 1993 (Wednesday)
In a barracks room at Naval Amphibious Base Coronado, California, United States Navy Ensign George P. Smith shoots and kills Lt. j.g. Alton Grizzard, a former Navy Midshipmen quarterback, and Ensign Kerryn O'Neill, then shoots and kills himself.
In the desert near the border between Yemen and Saudi Arabia, Yemeni kidnappers free American diplomat Haynes Mahoney after abducting him on November 25. Mahoney's captors negotiated with the Yemeni government for his release, making no demands of the U.S. government.
On World AIDS Day, the World Health Organization announces that 14 million people worldwide are now infected with HIV, the virus that causes AIDS.
A 19-year-old member of AIDS activist organization ACT-UP, who identifies himself as "Luke Sissyfag", heckles U.S. President Bill Clinton during his World AIDS Day speech at Georgetown University Medical Center in Washington, D.C., shouting, "You are doing nothing. You are sitting on your hands."
United States Secretary of the Navy John Howard Dalton announces that the Navy will assign hundreds of female sailors to aircraft carriers in 1994.
STS-61: NASA postpones the scheduled launch of Space Shuttle Endeavour until the following day due to weather.
Northwest Airlink Flight 5719 crashes in fog and drizzle during final approach to Chisholm-Hibbing Airport in Hibbing, Minnesota, killing all 18 people aboard.
Born: Reena Pärnat, Estonian Olympic archer; in Pärnu, Estonia
Died:
Lynette Davies, 45, Welsh actress, suicide by drowning (approximate date)
Ray Gillen, American rock singer-songwriter, 32 or 34, AIDS-related illness
Sir Ivor Hele, CBE, 81, Australian war artist and portraitist

December 2, 1993 (Thursday)

STS-61: NASA launches the Space Shuttle Endeavour on the first Hubble Space Telescope servicing mission at 4:26 a.m. Eastern Standard Time.
French car maker Renault and Swedish car maker Volvo cancel a planned merger that would have created the world's sixth-largest automotive manufacturer after executives at Volvo force a withdrawal over concerns about the direction of the future merged company.
The Troubles in Keady: 23-year-old British Army soldier Paul Garrett is shot and killed by an Irish Republican Army sniper during an Army foot patrol in Keady, County Armagh, Northern Ireland.
Detective James Edward O'Brien of the Oxnard, California Police Department is shot and killed while pursuing the suspect in a mass shooting at an unemployment office.
Born:
Kevin Fischnaller, Italian Olympic luger; in Brixen, South Tyrol, Italy
Haruka Ishida, Japanese actress and television personality; in Saitama Prefecture, Japan
Jak Roberto, Filipino actor, model and singer; in Nagcarlan, Laguna, Philippines
Kostas Stafylidis, Greek footballer; in Thessaloniki, Greece
Died:
Harry Julius Emeléus CBE, FRS, 90, British inorganic chemist
Pablo Escobar, 44, Colombian drug lord, shot by Colombian National Police in Medellín, Colombia

December 3, 1993 (Friday)

STS-61: The crew of Space Shuttle Endeavour sight the Hubble Space Telescope and begin the process of orbital rendezvous.
Law enforcement authorities seize  of heroin in Pae, Thailand.
The 1993 Davis Cup men's tennis final between Germany and Australia begins at the Messe Düsseldorf Exhibition Hall in Düsseldorf, Germany.
In Hartberg and Vienna, Austria, Roman Catholic priest August Janisch and journalist Silvana Meixner are injured when they open letter bombs addressed to them. These will prove to be the first of a series of letter bombings targeted at advocates for ethnic minorities and immigrants in Austria.
The 1993 National Finals Rodeo begins at the Thomas and Mack Arena in Paradise, Nevada. It will conclude on December 12.
Born:
Marques Brownlee, American YouTuber and professional ultimate frisbee player; in Maplewood, New Jersey
Clare Cryan, Irish diver
Died:
Witold Majchrzycki, 84, Polish Olympic boxer
Lea Mek, 18, member of the Asian Boyz street gang, murdered in gang shooting
Lewis Thomas, 80, American physician, author and educator, Waldenstrom's disease

December 4, 1993 (Saturday)
STS-61: Swiss astronaut Claude Nicollier captures the Hubble Space Telescope with Space Shuttle Endeavours remote manipulator arm and berths it in the shuttle's payload bay at 4:26 a.m. EST. At 10:46 p.m. EST, American astronauts Story Musgrave and Jeffrey A. Hoffman begin the mission's first extravehicular activity, which will be the second-longest spacewalk up to this point in NASA's history.
In Austria, a letter bomb sent to Helmut Schüller, president of the humanitarian organization Caritas Internationalis, is detected before being opened.
On or about this date, police officer L.C. Underwood kidnaps and murders Victor Gunnarsson, a former suspect in the 1986 assassination of Olof Palme, in North Carolina, perceiving Gunnarsson as a romantic rival for his former fiancée, Kay Weden. Three days later Weden's mother, Catherine Miller, will also be murdered; Underwood will be accused of that killing as well, but will never be tried for it.
In the 1993 SEC Championship Game, played at Legion Field in Birmingham, Alabama, the Florida Gators defeat the Alabama Crimson Tide by a score of 28–13.
American serial killer Richard Allen Davis provides investigators with information that allows them to find the body of 12-year-old Polly Klaas, whom Davis had murdered on October 1.Born: Taco van der Hoorn, Dutch cyclist; in Rotterdam, NetherlandsDied:Margaret Landon, 90, American Presbyterian missionary and writer
Hugh Moore, 64, City of London Police commander, heart failure two weeks after violent struggle with suspect
Roy Vernon, 56, Welsh international footballer, cancer
Frank Zappa, 52, American guitarist and composer, prostate cancer

December 5, 1993 (Sunday)
STS-61: American astronauts Kathryn C. Thornton and Thomas Akers conduct the mission's second extravehicular activity overnight (EST).
The 1993 World Women's Handball Championship concludes in Norway; Germany defeats Denmark in the final.
The 1993 Davis Cup final concludes in Düsseldorf, Germany, with Germany defeating Australia 4:1.
Omar Bongo is re-elected as President of Gabon in the country's first multiparty elections.
Helmut Zilk, the Mayor of Vienna, is severely injured and loses two fingers when he opens a letter bomb at his home. On the same day, two other letter bombs in Austria, one sent to the leader of a community of Slovenes and the other to Austrian Green Party politician Madeleine Petrovic, are discovered and neutralized before being opened. The series of letter bombings will prove to have been perpetrated by far-right extremist Franz Fuchs.
The Troubles: Catholic civilians John Todd, 31, and Brian Duffy, 15, are shot and killed by the Ulster Freedom Fighters while sitting in a car outside a taxi depot in Ligoniel, Belfast, Northern Ireland.
Rafael Caldera is elected President of Venezuela for the second time, succeeding interim president Ramón José Velásquez.Born: Ross Barkley, English footballer; in Liverpool, EnglandDied:Doug Hopkins, 32, American musician and songwriter, suicide by gunshot
Rita Macedo, 68, Mexican actress, suicide by gunshot

December 6, 1993 (Monday)

STS-61: Astronauts Musgrave and Hoffman begin the mission's third extravehicular activity at 10:34 p.m. EST.
Between 10:00 p.m. on December 6 and 1:00 a.m. on December 7, 46-year-old Lynn Marie Stansfield and 43-year-old Dale Gene Wolf are shot to death in a house in Penn Township, Perry County, Pennsylvania. Firefighters discover their bodies after responding to a fire at the house; it is believed the fire was set to destroy evidence.  the murders will remain unsolved.Born:Jasprit Bumrah, Indian cricketer; in Ahmedabad, Gujarat, India
Pedro Mendes, Portuguese footballer; in Barreiro, Portugal
Tautau Moga, Samoa international rugby league footballer; in Ipswich, Queensland, Australia
Miljan Rovcanin, Serbian professional boxer; in Bar, Republic of Montenegro, Federal Republic of YugoslaviaDied:Don Ameche, 85, American actor, prostate cancer
Alexandre Trauner, 87, Hungarian set designer

December 7, 1993 (Tuesday)
STS-61: Astronauts Thornton and Akers begin the mission's fourth extravehicular activity at 10:13 p.m. EST. They replace Hubble's High Speed Photometer (HSP) with the Corrective Optics Space Telescope Axial Replacement (COSTAR), the device that will correct for the spherical aberration of Hubble's primary mirror.
The Transitional Executive Committee, a government-in-waiting including members of the African National Congress and the National Party, is established in South Africa.
The Troubles: 38-year-old Catholic civilian Robert McClay is shot and killed by the Ulster Freedom Fighters at his home in Ballyhackamore, Belfast, Northern Ireland.
In Garden City, New York, six people are murdered and 19 injured in the 1993 Long Island Rail Road shooting, a racially motivated mass shooting perpetrated by Colin Ferguson, a black Jamaican immigrant.
Richard Allen Davis is charged with the kidnapping and murder of Polly Klaas.Born:Jasmine V (born Jasmine Marie Villegas), American singer; in San Jose, California
Rahama Sadau, Nigerian actress and filmmaker; in Kaduna, Nigeria
Kiyou Shimizu, Japanese Olympic karateka; in Osaka, JapanDied:Nicky Crane, 35, English neo-Nazi activist, AIDS-related bronchopneumonia, cited in 
Abidin Dino, 80, Turkish artist and painter
Félix Houphouët-Boigny, 88, 1st President of Ivory Coast, the oldest African head of state, prostate cancer
Wolfgang Paul, 80, German physicist, Nobel Prize laureate

December 8, 1993 (Wednesday)
STS-61: Astronauts Musgrave and Hoffman begin the mission's fifth and final extravehicular activity at 10:30 p.m. EST. The EVA will conclude at 5:51 a.m. EST on December 9.
In Schleswig, Schleswig-Holstein, Germany, neo-Nazis Michael Peters and Lars Christiansen are convicted of the murders of the three Turkish people killed in the 1992 Mölln arson attack. For the firebombing that killed 51-year-old Bahide Arslan, 10-year-old Yeliz Arslan and 14-year-old Ayse Yilmaz, Peters is sentenced to life in prison and Christiansen to 10 years. These are the maximum possible sentences, since Christiansen was 19 at the time of the murders and was tried as a juvenile.
Using eight pens, U.S. President Bill Clinton signs the North American Free Trade Agreement into law.
Massachusetts General Hospital and Brigham and Women's Hospital, both in Boston, Massachusetts, approve a merger to cut costs and gain greater bargaining power with insurance companies. Each hospital will retain its own name and programs.Born:Janari Jõesaar, Estonian professional basketball player
Cara Mund, Miss America 2018; in Bismarck, North Dakota
Jordan Obita, English footballer; in Oxford, England
AnnaSophia Robb, American actress, singer and model; in Denver, Colorado
Óscar Salas, Honduran professional and Olympic footballer; in Olanchito, HondurasDied: Yevgeny Minayev, 60, Soviet Olympic champion weightlifter, starvation and hypothermia

December 9, 1993 (Thursday)

Andrew Lloyd Webber's musical Sunset Boulevard receives its American premiere in Los Angeles.Born:Mark McMorris, Canadian professional and Olympic snowboarder; in Regina, Saskatchewan, Canada
Laura Smulders, Dutch Olympic racing cyclist; in Nijmegen, Netherlands
Olga Zubova, Russian weightlifterDied: Danny Blanchflower, 67, Northern Ireland international footballer and football manager, bronchopneumonia

December 10, 1993 (Friday)
STS-61: The crew of Space Shuttle Endeavour release the repaired Hubble Space Telescope back into orbit.
62-year-old Libyan human rights activist Mansour Rashid El-Kikhia, an opponent of Muammar Gaddafi, disappears in Cairo, Egypt. His body will be found in October 2012 in a refrigerator in Tripoli, Libya.
A knife-wielding man hijacks Air France Flight 2306 between Paris and Nice shortly before arriving at Nice. Despite demands to be flown to Tripoli, the aircraft lands as intended at Nice Côte d'Azur Airport, where all 123 passengers and six crew members onboard are released unharmed.
Scottish soldiers Paul Callaghan and David Reid of the British Army's 5th Airborne Brigade are last seen alive this morning as they begin an off-duty climbing weekend in Glen Coe, during which they will be swept away by an avalanche on Stob Coire nan Beith. After an extensive and dangerous search and rescue effort, their bodies will be found at the bottom of Summit Gully on December 14.
The last shift leaves Monkwearmouth Colliery in Sunderland, Tyne and Wear, England. The closure of the 158-year-old pit marks the end of the old County Durham coalfield, which had been in operation since the Middle Ages.
Nelson Mandela and F. W. de Klerk are awarded the 1993 Nobel Peace Prize at Oslo City Hall in Oslo, Norway.
id Software's Doom is released, becoming a landmark title in first-person shooter video games.Died:Fernand Mithouard, 84, French professional cyclist
Alice Tully, 91, American opera and recital singer and arts patron
Alan E. Zimmer, M.D., 64, American neuroradiologist, stroke

December 11, 1993 (Saturday)
One of the three blocks of the Highland Towers near Kuala Lumpur, Malaysia collapses, killing 48.
Henri Konan Bédié succeeds Félix Houphouët-Boigny, who died on December 7, as President of Ivory Coast.
1993 Chilean general election: Eduardo Frei Ruiz-Tagle is elected President of Chile with 58% of the vote.
In the Atlantic Ocean, the  boat on which 63-year-old Herbert Clarity and 47-year-old Anthony Suraleigh are sailing from New York to Bermuda capsizes in a sudden storm with  waves and  winds. The two men ride out the storm in a life raft for 11 hours before a Japanese freighter headed for Ireland rescues them. Clarity and Suraleigh will fly back to New York from Ireland on December 23.
In Howard County, Maryland, 23-year-old David Mark Kohl is crushed to death by his brother's house when it slips and falls on him while being raised on jacks to install a foundation underneath.Born:Yalitza Aparicio, Mexican actress and educator; in Tlaxiaco, Mexico
Tyrone Gilks, Australian motorcycle personality; in Newcastle, New South Wales, Australia (d. 2013 in training crash)
Mikoy Morales (born Vincent Marco Chu Morales), Filipino actor, model and singer; in Roxas, Capiz, PhilippinesDied:Bill Mumm , 71, New Zealand rugby union player and politician
Elvira Popescu, 99, Romanian-French actress

December 12, 1993 (Sunday)
In the 1993 Russian constitutional referendum, 58.4% of voters approve of the new Constitution of Russia.
The Troubles: Protestants Andrew Beacom, 46, and Ernest Smith, 49, both members of the Royal Ulster Constabulary, are shot and killed by the Irish Republican Army while sitting in an RUC civilian-type car in Fivemiletown, County Tyrone, Northern Ireland.
In Palm Beach County, Florida, a  lion named Helmut attacks and severely injures an employee at Lion Country Safari.Born: Zeli Ismail, English footballer; in Kukës, AlbaniaDied:József Antall, 61, 53rd Prime Minister of Hungary, non-Hodgkin lymphoma
Ned Barry, 88, New Zealand rugby union player and police officer

December 13, 1993 (Monday)
60 people die and 8 are injured in a fire at a textile factory in Fuzhou, China.

STS-61: Space Shuttle Endeavour lands at Kennedy Space Center at 12:26 a.m. EST, completing its successful mission to repair the Hubble Space Telescope.
The Congress of the Philippines enacts Republic Act No. 7659, reinstating capital punishment for selected crimes, which had been banned in the 1987 Constitution of the Philippines.
The Parliament of Kazakhstan approves the Treaty on the Non-Proliferation of Nuclear Weapons and agrees to dismantle the more than 100 missiles left on its territory by the fall of the USSR.
French erotic novelists Vanessa Duriès and Jean-Pierre Imbrohoris (known as Joy Laurey), Imbrohoris' wife (writer Nathalie Perreau) and Imbrohoris' son are killed in a traffic collision in Montélimar, France.
The Troubles: 26-year-old Protestant civilian Noel Cardwell is found dead, shot by the Ulster Freedom Fighters, in an unoccupied flat in Shankill, Belfast, Northern Ireland. He is rumored to have been an informer.
Former Prime Minister of Canada Kim Campbell resigns as leader of the Progressive Conservative Party and is succeeded as leader by Jean Charest.Born: Shaun Edwards, Australian rules footballerDied:Larry Cameron, 41, National Football League and Canadian Football League player and professional wrestler; heart attack in ring during match with Tony St. Clair in Bremen, Germany
Vanessa Duriès (a.k.a. Katia Lamara), 20–21, French novelist, traffic collision
Joy Laurey (pen name of Jean-Pierre Imbrohoris), 50, French novelist, traffic collision

December 14, 1993 (Tuesday)
Algerian Civil War: Members of the Armed Islamic Group of Algeria massacre 12 Christian employees of the Croatian construction company Hidroelektra in a village southwest of Algiers.
19-year-old Nathan Dunlap, a former employee of an Aurora, Colorado Chuck E. Cheese, shoots and kills four people at the restaurant and wounds a fifth. Dunlap will be sentenced to death in 1996. His sentence will be commuted to life in prison without the possibility of parole when Colorado abolishes the death penalty in 2020.Born: Antonio Giovinazzi, Italian racing driver; in Martina Franca, ItalyDied:Jeff Alm, 25, National Football League defensive tackle, suicide by gunshot after causing his best friend's death in car crash
Shirley J. Dreiss, 44, American hydrologist and hydrogeologist, traffic collision
Francis Jones CVO, TD, DL, FSA, MA, KStJ, 85, Welsh historian and officer of arms
Myrna Loy, 88, American actress

December 15, 1993 (Wednesday)
A Lockheed C-130 Hercules military plane carrying relief supplies for victims of Typhoon Lola crashes into a hill and explodes in Libmanan, Camarines Sur, Philippines. Out of about 30 people on board, twenty-four bodies are retrieved from the crash site.
First Nagorno-Karabakh War: The Azerbaijani Armed Forces launch Operation Kalbajar, a military offensive against the Armed Forces of Armenia and the Nagorno-Karabakh Republic, which will continue until February 1994.
The Troubles: Irish Taoiseach Albert Reynolds and British Prime Minister John Major issue their joint Downing Street Declaration on the future of Northern Ireland.
The Uruguay Round of General Agreement on Tariffs and Trade (GATT) talks reach a successful conclusion after seven years.Born:Yuko Araki, Japanese actress and model; in Tokyo, Japan
Alina Eremia, Romanian singer; in Buftea, Ilfov County, RomaniaDied:Raúl Esnal, 37, Uruguayan footballer, murdered in El Salvador; the case remains unsolved
Ratu Sir Penaia Ganilau , 75, 1st President of Fiji, leukemia
William Dale Phillips, 68, American chemist

December 16, 1993 (Thursday)
In Chelsea, Michigan, science teacher Stephen Leith returns to Chelsea High School with a handgun after a meeting to discuss a grievance he had filed over a reprimand for inappropriate remarks about a female student. He shoots and kills Superintendent Joseph Piasecki and wounds Principal Ron Mead and teacher Phil Jones. Leith will subsequently be convicted of first-degree murder and sentenced to life in prison without the possibility of parole.Born:Jyoti Amge, Indian actress, world's shortest living woman; in Nagpur, Maharashtra, India
Thiago Braz, Brazilian Olympic champion pole vaulter; in Marília, São Paulo, Brazil
Lola Créton, French actress; in Paris, France
Stephan James, Canadian actor; in Toronto, Ontario, CanadaDied:Charizma (born Charles Edward Hicks Jr.), 20, American MC, murdered
Moses Gunn, 64, American actor, complications of asthma
Charles Moore, 68, American architect, heart attack
Kakuei Tanaka, 75, Japanese politician, 40th Prime Minister of Japan, pneumonia

December 17, 1993 (Friday)
Brazil's Supreme Federal Court rules that former President Fernando Collor de Mello may not hold elected office again until 2000 due to political corruption.
In the State Dining Room of the White House, U.S. President Bill Clinton reads A Visit from St. Nicholas to children from six elementary schools in the Washington, D.C. area.
In the 1993 Las Vegas Bowl, played at the Sam Boyd Silver Bowl in Whitney, Nevada, the Utah State Aggies defeat the Ball State Cardinals by a score of 42–33.Born:Kiersey Clemons, American actress and singer; in Los Angeles, California
Patricia Kú Flores, Peruvian tennis player; in Lima, Peru
Cailin Russo, American model and musician; in San Diego, CaliforniaDied:Bobby Davidson, 65, Scottish football referee
Janet Margolin, 50, American actress, ovarian cancer

December 18, 1993 (Saturday)
In the 1993 NCAA Division I-AA Football Championship Game, played at Marshall University Stadium in Huntington, West Virginia, the Youngstown State Penguins defeat the Marshall Thundering Herd by a score of 17–5.
The MGM Grand Las Vegas hotel and casino opens in Paradise, Nevada.Born:Anton McKee, Icelandic Olympic swimmer; in Reykjavík, Iceland
Byron Buxton, American Major League Baseball center fielder; in Baxley, Georgia
Kerri Gowler, New Zealand Olympic champion rower; in Raetihi, Manawatū-Whanganui, New Zealand
Thomas Lam, Finnish-Dutch footballer; in Amsterdam, Netherlands
Ana Porgras, Romanian artistic gymnast; in Galați, Romania
Riria (born Riria Baba), Japanese actress; in Tokyo, Japan
Souliya Syphasay, Laotian footballer; in Vientiane, LaosDied:Georges Bégué, 82, French engineer and Special Operations Executive agent
Helm Glöckler, 84, German amateur racing driver
Sam Wanamaker,  (born Samuel Wattenmacker), 74, American film director and actor, prostate cancer

December 19, 1993 (Sunday)
Lansana Conté is confirmed in office in the 1993 Guinean presidential election with 51.71% of the vote.Born:Ali Adnan Kadhim, Iraqi professional and Olympic footballer; in Baghdad, Iraq
Alkaline (born Earlan Bartley), Jamaican dancehall and reggae musician; in Kingston, Jamaica
Leonardo Bittencourt, German footballer; in Leipzig, Saxony, Germany
Hermione Corfield, English actress; in London, England
Isiah Koech, Kenyan Olympic long-distance runner; in Keringet, Kenya
José Leclerc, Dominican Major League Baseball relief pitcher; in Esperanza, Dominican Republic
Christopher Rühr, German Olympic field hockey player; in Düsseldorf, North Rhine-Westphalia, Germany
Stephanie Venier, Austrian Olympic alpine skier; in Innsbruck, Tyrol, AustriaDied:Michael Clarke, 47, American musician (The Byrds), liver failure
Owain Owain (born Owen Owen), 64, Welsh nuclear scientist, novelist and poet

December 20, 1993 (Monday)
The United Nations General Assembly votes to appoint a U.N. High Commissioner for Human Rights.
Ten months after the 1993 World Trade Center bombing, The New York Times reports that the Port Authority of New York and New Jersey is searching for a new advertising agency to encourage greater use of the World Trade Center complex. Former Boston Globe editor Matthew V. Storin will later suggest that this indicated "a return to complacency" after the bombing.
17 teenagers die in a fire at the Kheyvis nightclub in Olivos, Buenos Aires, Argentina.
The Hubble Space Telescope takes its first corrected images.Born:Ali Abdi, Tunisian footballer; in Sfax, Tunisia
Andrea Belotti, Italian footballer; in Calcinate, Italy
Yana Egorian, Russian Olympic champion sabre fencer; in Yerevan, Armenia
Robeisy Ramírez, Cuban Olympic champion and professional boxer; in Cienfuegos, CubaDied:Gussie Nell Davis, 87, American educator and founder of the Kilgore College Rangerettes
W. Edwards Deming, 93, American engineer, professor, author, lecturer, and management consultant; cancer
Nazife Güran, 72, Turkish composer
Iichirō Hatoyama, 75, Japanese politician and diplomat

December 21, 1993 (Tuesday)
The Hungarian Parliament elects Péter Boross Prime Minister of Hungary following the death of József Antall on December 12.
The United States Department of Defense issues the "Don't ask, don't tell" policy under Directive 1304.26.Born:Cody Ceci, Canadian professional ice hockey defenceman; in Ottawa, Ontario, Canada
Alex Iafallo, American professional ice hockey forward; in Eden, New York
Uvaldo Luna, Mexican footballer; in Channelview, Greater Houston, Texas
Malcolm Subban, Canadian professional ice hockey goaltender; in Toronto, Ontario, CanadaDied:Guy des Cars, 82, French novelist This source gives des Cars' date of death as December 22, 1993.
Sir Philip Christison, 100, British Army officer
Zack Mosley, 87, American comics artist
Pekka Niemi, 84, Finnish Olympic cross-country skier
Margarita Nikolaeva, 58, Soviet Olympic champion gymnast

December 22, 1993 (Wednesday)
Croat–Bosniak War: Members of the Army of the Republic of Bosnia and Herzegovina perpetrate the Križančevo selo massacre, killing at least 12 Croatian Defence Council prisoners of war and two female Croatian non-combatants.
1994 Texas gubernatorial election: The Republican Party of Texas rejects Dallas preacher James Bridges' application to run in the Republican gubernatorial primary because the check for the $3,000 filing fee bounced. On the same day, Bridges' church burns down.
In the Denver, Colorado area, eight shopping malls close their Santa displays after receiving death threats directed at Santa Claus by mail and fax machine. By the following day, Santa will be greeting children at over a dozen police and fire stations in the area.Born:Fazly Mazlan (born Muhammad Fazly bin Mazlan), Malaysian footballer; in Muar District, Johor, Malaysia
Raphaël Guerreiro, Portuguese footballer; in Le Blanc-Mesnil, France
David Klemmer, Australian rugby league footballer; in Sydney, Australia
Aliana Lohan, American actress, model, and singer; in Cold Spring Harbor, New York
Gabriel Medina (born Gabriel Medina Pinto Ferreira), Brazilian professional surfer; in São Sebastião, São Paulo, Brazil
Hedvig Rasmussen, Danish Olympic rower; in Frederiksberg, Denmark
Meghan Trainor, American singer-songwriter, musician, and producer; in Nantucket, MassachusettsDied:Sylvia Bataille (born Sylvia Maklès), 85, French actress, cardiac arrest
Marion Burns, 86, American actress
Don DeFore, 80, American actor, cardiac arrest
Alexander Mackendrick, 81, British-American film director, pneumonia
Salah Zulfikar, 67, Egyptian actor and film producer, heart attack

December 23, 1993 (Thursday)
Pope John Paul II declares Émilie Gamelin, the founder of the Sisters of Providence of Montreal, to be Venerable (the second of the four stages of Catholic sainthood). He will beatify her on October 7, 2001.
Whitewater controversy: U.S. President Bill Clinton instructs his attorney, David E. Kendall, to turn over to the United States Department of Justice all records related to Clinton's investment in Whitewater Development Corporation, including the documents White House Counsel Bernard Nussbaum removed from Vince Foster's office after Foster's July 20 suicide.
Debbie Tucker Loveless and John Harvey Miller, who have both been serving life prison sentences, are released on bond after their convictions for the alleged murder of Loveless' 4-year-old daughter in January 1989 were overturned the previous week. The Texas Court of Criminal Appeals overturned the convictions due to the couple having ineffective counsel and the failure of the prosecution to turn over medical records to the defense. Loveless and Miller maintained that the child died as a result of a dog attack and that their first attorney ignored evidence supporting their explanation. Prosecutors will dismiss the charges against Loveless and Miller on May 2, 1994.
National Football League quarterback Troy Aikman agrees to an eight-year, $50 million contract with the Dallas Cowboys, making him the richest player in NFL history up to this time.Born:Claudio Baeza, Chilean footballer; in Los Ángeles, Chile
Felix Großschartner, Austrian cyclist; in Wels, Austria
Ruriko Kojima, Japanese gravure idol and sportscaster; in Ichihara, Chiba, Japan
Riho Otake, Japanese volleyball player; in Yokohama, Kanagawa Prefecture, Japan
Emmanuel Stockbroekx, Belgian Olympic field hockey player; in Brasschaat, Belgium
Nicolae Tanovițchii, Moldovan professional racing cyclist; in Chișinău, Moldova
Jasmine Todd, American track and field athlete; in San Diego, California
Delano Williams, British Olympic sprinter; in Grand Turk Island, Turks and Caicos IslandsDied:Gertrude Blom, 92, Swiss journalist, social anthropologist and documentary photographer
James Ellison (born James Ellison Smith), 83, American actor, fall
Jean Maréchal, 83, French racing cyclist
Marcello Neri, 91, Italian Olympic cyclist

December 24, 1993 (Friday)
Two crocodiles attack and kill 48-year-old Cassey Bond while he is swimming in the Jardine River on the Cape York Peninsula in Far North Queensland, Australia.
Five shoppers are killed and 48 others are wounded in a grenade explosion at a market in Misamis Occidental, Philippines.
During a family Christmas Eve supper in Montauban, France, a table explodes, piercing a man's neck artery with a shard of glass and causing him to bleed to death.
In the 1993 John Hancock Bowl, played at the Sun Bowl in El Paso, Texas, the Oklahoma Sooners defeat the Texas Tech Red Raiders by a score of 41–10.Born: Mariya Nishiuchi, Japanese model, actress and singer-songwriter; in Fukuoka, JapanDied:Dorothea Parker, 65, New Zealand sprinter, cancer
Norman Vincent Peale, 95, American preacher and writer, stroke
Sveinbjörn Beinteinsson, 69, Icelandic Modern Pagan religious leader, heart failure
Yen Chia-kan, 88, Taiwanese politician and 2nd President of the Republic of China

December 25, 1993 (Saturday)
The new Constitution of Russia comes into effect upon its publication.
The Troubles: Queen Elizabeth II speaks of the year's progress towards peace in Northern Ireland in her Royal Christmas Message to the United Kingdom.
A 59-year-old woman identified by the press as "Jennifer F." gives birth to twins at a hospital in London, occasioning controversy and comment across Europe.
In the 1993 Aloha Bowl, played at Aloha Stadium in Honolulu, Hawaii, the Colorado Buffaloes defeat the Fresno State Bulldogs by a score of 41–30.Born:Leonardo Basso, Italian cyclist; in Castelfranco Veneto, Italy
Ariadna Gutiérrez, Colombian actress, television host, and model, Miss Colombia 2014; in Sincelejo, Sucre Department, Colombia
Emi Takei, Japanese actress, fashion model, and singer; in Nagoya, JapanDied:Pierre Victor Auger, 94, French physicist
Princess Marie Adelheid of Lippe, 98
Ama Naidoo OLS (born Manonmoney Pillay), 85, South African anti-apartheid activist, heart failure
Jeff Phillips, 30, American professional skateboarder, suicide by gunshot
Nikolai Timkov, 81, Soviet Russian painter

December 26, 1993 (Sunday)
The 1993 Sydney to Hobart Yacht Race begins. It will conclude on January 3, 1994.
Grenade attacks occur at the Roman Catholic Davao Cathedral and at a Muslim mosque in Davao City, Philippines. At least six people are killed and more than 130 are wounded in the first incident, while there are no casualties in the second one.
Actress Marlene Dietrich's grave in Berlin, Germany, is desecrated and covered with feces the day before what would have been her 92nd birthday.Born: Taleni Seu, New Zealand rugby union player; in Auckland, New Zealand

December 27, 1993 (Monday)
Israeli soldiers in southern Lebanon, mistaking a United Nations patrol for a guerrilla group, kill one Norwegian soldier and wound another.
Career criminal Roger Hoan Brady shoots and kills Officer Martin L. Ganz of the Manhattan Beach, California Police Department during a traffic stop. Ganz's 12-year-old nephew, who is on a ride-along with him, is unharmed.Born: Olivia Cooke, English actress; in Oldham, Greater Manchester, EnglandDied:Michael Callen, 38, American singer, composer, author and AIDS activist; AIDS-related complications of pulmonary Kaposi's sarcoma
Feliks Kibbermann, 91, Estonian chess master and philologist
Evald Mikson, 82, Estonian footballer, police officer and war criminal
André Pilette, 75, Belgian racing driver

December 28, 1993 (Tuesday)
In New York state, four out of six parcel bombs sent to family members of Brenda Lazore, the ex-girlfriend of Michael Stevens, explode, killing five people. Lazore's mother, stepfather and sister, a coworker of her stepfather and a friend of her sister are all killed; her uncle is injured. Two other bombs sent to family members are intercepted by police. Stevens and his friend Earl Figley will be charged in the bombings on December 29.
In the 1993 Liberty Bowl, played at Liberty Bowl Memorial Stadium in Memphis, Tennessee, the Louisville Cardinals defeat the Michigan State Spartans by a score of 18–7.
In Williamson County, Tennessee, American country singer-songwriter Billy Ray Cyrus marries Leticia Jean Finley, the mother of his 1-year-old daughter, Destiny Hope Cyrus (later known as Miley Cyrus).
Canadian singer and songwriter Shania Twain marries South African record producer Robert John "Mutt" Lange. They will divorce in 2010.Born: Yua Shinkawa, Japanese actress and model; in Saitama Prefecture, JapanDied:Alfonso Balcázar, 67, Spanish screenwriter, film director and producer
Howard Caine (born Howard Cohen), 65 or 67, American actor, heart attack
John Kemp, 53, New Zealand footballer and cricketer
William L. Shirer, 89, American journalist and historian

December 29, 1993 (Wednesday)
Japanese climber Yasuko Namba summits the Vinson Massif, the tallest mountain in Antarctica, as part of her attempt to climb all Seven Summits. She will die in the 1996 Mount Everest disaster.

At this time it is the largest outdoor bronze Buddha statue in the world.
31-year-old French footballer Pierre Bianconi, a Corsican nationalist, disappears. His car is found at the port of Bastia, Corsica.
The Troubles: The Irish Republican Army releases a New Year's message making no mention of a ceasefire, indicating uncertainty about the Downing Street Declaration issued on December 15.
Alberto Fujimori, the President of Peru, signs the new Constitution of Peru in Lima.
9-year-old Joey Jacobs of Chester Township, Ohio loses both ears while holding off a Rottweiler attacking two younger children. The dog had run over a buried-wire fence produced by Invisible Fence Inc. to attack them.
In the 1993 Copper Bowl, played at Arizona Stadium in Tucson, Arizona, the Kansas State Wildcats defeat the Wyoming Cowboys by a score of 52–17.Born:Travis Head, Australian international cricketer; in Adelaide, South Australia
Gabby May, Canadian artistic gymnast; in Winnipeg, Manitoba, CanadaDied:Marie Kean, 75, Irish actress
Frunzik Mkrtchyan, 63, Armenian stage and film actor

December 30, 1993 (Thursday)
The Congress Party gains a parliamentary majority in India after the defection of 10 Janata Dal party lawmakers.
In Jerusalem, representatives of Israel and the Holy See sign the Fundamental Agreement Between the Holy See and the State of Israel, preparing for the establishment of diplomatic relations.
Heidelberg Tavern massacre: Three operatives of the Azanian People's Liberation Army open fire at a tavern in Observatory, Cape Town, South Africa, killing four students.
The Troubles in Crossmaglen: 23-year-old British Army soldier Daniel Blinco is shot and killed by an Irish Republican Army sniper during an Army foot patrol in Crossmaglen, County Armagh, Northern Ireland.
Argentina passes a measure allowing President Carlos Menem and all future presidents to run for a second consecutive term. It also shortens presidential terms to four years and removes the requirement for the president to be Roman Catholic.
In the 1993 Freedom Bowl, played at Anaheim Stadium in Anaheim, California, the USC Trojans defeat the Utah Utes by a score of 28–21.
In the 1993 Holiday Bowl, played at Jack Murphy Stadium in San Diego, California, the Ohio State Buckeyes defeat the BYU Cougars, also by a score of 28–21.Died:İhsan Sabri Çağlayangil, 84–85, Turkish diplomat and politician
Irving Paul Lazar, 86, American talent agent
Giuseppe Occhialini, 86, Italian physicist

December 31, 1993 (Friday)
In the 1993 Peach Bowl (December), played at the Georgia Dome in Atlanta, Georgia, the Clemson Tigers defeat the Kentucky Wildcats by a score of 14–13.
In the 1993 Gator Bowl, played at Gator Bowl Stadium in Jacksonville, Florida, the Alabama Crimson Tide defeat the North Carolina Tar Heels by a score of 24–10.
In the 1993 Independence Bowl, played at Independence Stadium in Shreveport, Louisiana, the Virginia Tech Hokies defeat the Indiana Hoosiers by a score of 45–20.
In the inaugural edition of the Alamo Bowl, played at the Alamodome in San Antonio, Texas, the California Golden Bears defeat the Iowa Hawkeyes by a score of 37–3.
In Pampa, Texas, Twila Busby is strangled and bludgeoned to death and her two adult sons, Randy Busby and Elwin Caler, are stabbed to death. Busby's live-in boyfriend, Hank Skinner, will be convicted of the murders in 1995 and sentenced to death.Born:Ryan Blaney, American race car driver; in Hartford Township, Trumbull County, Ohio
Dave Richards, Welsh footballer; in Abergavenny, WalesDied:'''
Zviad Gamsakhurdia, 54, Georgian politician, 1st President of Georgia, gunshot to head
Brandon Teena, 21, American murder victim, killed along with Lisa Lambert and Phillip DeVine in Humboldt, Nebraska. Teena's story will later become the basis for the film Boys Don't Cry''.
Thomas J. Watson Jr., 79, American businessman, political figure, and philanthropist, complications from a stroke

Footnotes

References

1993
December 1993 events
1993-12
1993-12